Maurizio Ciaramitaro (born 16 January 1982) is a former Italian football midfielder.

Career
A Palermo youth system product, Ciaramitaro was however never constantly included into the first team and was instead often sent out on loan throughout his career: he had spells of such kind at Avellino, Livorno (also co-ownership deal), Cesena (co-ownership deal in second season), Parma and Chievo.

He was bought back from Cesena in June 2006 by terminated the co-ownership agreement but sent to Parma as part of Fabio Simplicio and Mark Bresciano's deal. Igor Budan also left for Parma from Palermo. He returned to Palermo in January 2007. He then left for Chievo on loan with first-option to sign. In January 2009 he left for Salernitana with option to co-own the player.

In July 2009 he was loaned out again, this time to Swiss Super League side AC Bellinzona.

He returned to Palermo in June 2010 after his loan to Bellinzona ended, but the Sicilian club did not find a good destination for him in the summer, thus forcing Ciaramitaro to stay at the team, but without being included into the first team.

On 6 January 2011, he terminated his contract with club  and joined Modena on free transfer.

References

External links

 

1982 births
Footballers from Palermo
Living people
Italian footballers
Association football defenders
Palermo F.C. players
U.S. Avellino 1912 players
U.S. Livorno 1915 players
A.C. Cesena players
Parma Calcio 1913 players
A.C. ChievoVerona players
U.S. Salernitana 1919 players
AC Bellinzona players
Modena F.C. players
L.R. Vicenza players
Trapani Calcio players
Serie A players
Serie B players
Serie C players
Swiss Super League players
Italian expatriate footballers
Expatriate footballers in Switzerland